Fier was a first-rate three-decker ship of the line of the French Royal Navy. She was armed on completion with 90 guns, comprising twenty-six 36-pounder guns on the lower deck, twenty-eight 18-pounder guns on the middle deck, and twenty-six 8-pounder guns on the upper deck, with ten 6-pounder guns on the quarterdeck. In 1706 an extra pair of 36-pounders was added on the lower deck, and an extra pair of 8-pounders on the upper deck, giving her 94 guns in total,

Designed and constructed by Honoré Malet and Pierre Masson jointly, she was begun at Rochefort in 1693 and launched on 1694, thus becoming the last three-decker to join Louis XIV's Navy. She took part in the Battle of Vélez-Málaga on 13 August 1704. In July 1707 she was sunk in shallow water at Toulon to avoid the fire from bomb vessels, but was refloated in October. She was condemned at Toulon in March 1713, and was sold to be broken up in November 1715.

References

Nomenclature des Vaisseaux du Roi-Soleil de 1661 a 1715. Alain Demerliac (Editions Omega, Nice – various dates).
The Sun King's Vessels (2015) - Jean-Claude Lemineur; English translation by François Fougerat. Editions ANCRE.  
Winfield, Rif and Roberts, Stephen (2017) French Warships in the Age of Sail 1626-1786: Design, Construction, Careers and Fates. Seaforth Publishing. .

Ships of the line of the French Navy
1690s ships
Ships built in France